XenClient is a discontinued desktop virtualization product developed by Citrix that runs virtual desktops on endpoint devices. The product reached end of-life in December 2016. Desktops are run locally, without hosting applications or the operating system in a datacenter. It consists of a Type-1 Xen client hypervisor and a management server, which provides features such as centralized provisioning, patching, updating, monitoring, policy controls, and de-provisioning.  It enforces security through features including  AES-256 full disk encryption, VM isolation, remote kill, lockout, USB filtering, and VLAN tagging.  XenClient supports use cases such as disconnected operation on laptops, limited connectivity environments (such as branch offices), and other use cases where use of local execution is desired and centralized management is required.

History
XenClient was announced as "Project Independence", a joint project with Intel in January 2009. XenClient 1.0 was released by Citrix in September 2010 after working with partners such as Intel, Dell, HP, and Microsoft. In May 2012, Citrix acquired Virtual Computer, another provider of client-hosted desktop virtualization solutions. Today, Citrix has combined the NxTop solution from Virtual Computer with the Xen hypervisor in XenClient 4.5, which was released in December 2012.

Overview
XenClient is available in three different editions: XenClient Enterprise, XenClient Express, and XenClient XT.  
 
XenClient Enterprise is a desktop virtualization product composed of a client hypervisor, the XenClient Enterprise Engine, and a management server, the XenClient Enterprise Synchronizer. It includes features such as image management, patching and updating, backup and recovery, security and policy management, and PC migration. It is designed for enterprises and is available either standalone or through XenDesktop Enterprise and Platinum editions.

XenClient Express is the free edition of XenClient Enterprise which provides access to the XenClient Engine and a license to use the XenClient Synchronizer for up to 10 devices. It is designed for IT professionals, consultants, and small businesses.

XenClient XT has a special, hardened version of the XenClient Engine client hypervisor and hardware-assisted features for a high level of security. It is designed for the public sector and other industries with extreme security requirements.

How XenClient Enterprise works
XenClient Enterprise has two major components. The first is the XenClient Enterprise Engine, which includes the client hypervisor and any virtual machines managed by the hypervisor. The second is the XenClient Enterprise Synchronizer, the management server which manages multiple XenClient Enterprise Engines.

XenClient Enterprise Engine
XenClient Enterprise Engine is a Type-1 client hypervisor which runs on bare metal or directly on the hardware. It uses the open source Xen hypervisor which lets users run multiple virtual machines simultaneously. Since the virtual machines are executed locally, XenClient users can work online or offline, regardless of network connection or location.

XenClient Enterprise Synchronizer
Users of XenClient Enterprise Engine download images from the XenClient Enterprise Synchronizer and run them locally on their laptops or PCs. These images are created on the Synchronizer and deployed (often as a golden image) to users across an organization. Images can be backed up and restored, patched and updated, and security policies may be defined for them. Security policies include remote wipe/kill capabilities, AES-NI 256-bit full disk encryption, and time-based lockout policies. Moreover, images can be migrated to a different laptop or PC in case of loss, corruption, or disaster.

The Synchronizer also has a remote office server capability to support branch office and remote users. Remote office servers are managed by a central Synchronizer and images are downloaded from the central server to remote servers over the WAN. These images are then cached and transmitted over the LAN to branch office and remote users to reduce WAN utilization. Backups are also done locally over the LAN for improved performance and disaster recovery.

Use
XenClient is used by organizations for many different purposes. Some of the major uses of XenClient are to:

• Simplify management of PCs by letting IT admins deploy and manage a single golden image for many PCs

• Allow users to work from anywhere and give IT central control by offering desktop virtualization for offline laptops

• Protect corporate data by enforcing security policies and backing up corporate and user data

• Reduce the cost of supporting PCs in remote and branch offices with remote office servers

• Support Windows 7 migrations with hardware-independent images propagated to all users

• Manage shared PCs for kiosks, labs and training facilities by provisioning and managing several PCs at a time

• Repurpose existing PCs as thin clients by managing the thin-client device

Customers
Many businesses in different industries have deployed XenClient, including companies from industries such as healthcare, energy, and retail. XenClient customers include: Swisscom, Afval Energie Bedrijf (AEB), Advanced Medical Imaging, Visma ITC, Residential Finance Corporation (RFC), Eyecare Medical Group, InTown Veterinary Group, Town of Lincoln, Massachusetts

Recognition
XenClient has been recognized as an industry leader in client virtualization. Citrix placed in the Leaders category of the latest “Worldwide Client Virtualization 2012 Vendor Analysis” IDC MarketScape report. In 2011, Frank Ohlhorst of SearchVirtualDesktop said that XenClient ‘offers excellent performance and improved stability’. In 2012, Andrew Wood of The Virtualization Practice called XenClient ‘a revolution in desktop virtualization for laptops’.

Known limitations
Since XenClient is a Type-1 client hypervisor, it does not work with every type of operating system or hardware. For example, it does not support the Mac operating system. However, the latest version of XenClient (XenClient 5.0) has an expanded Hardware Compatibility List (HCL) with support for newer laptops or PCs, including Ultrabooks and 3rd generation Intel Core processors. In addition, XenClient has been demonstrated on the Mac OS in the past, meaning that a Mac solution is possible sometime in the future.

References

External links
 Citrix XenClient site

Citrix Systems
Virtualization software